Ezra Hall Gillett (1823–1875) was an American clergyman and author.

Biography
Ezra Hall Gillett was born at Colchester, Connecticut on July 15, 1823. He graduated in 1841 at Yale, and in 1844 at the Union Theological Seminary, and became pastor of a Presbyterian church in Harlem, N. Y. In 1868 he was appointed professor of political economy, ethics, and history in New York University.

He died at his home in Harlem on September 2, 1875.

Works
In addition to numerous contributions to the theological reviews, he published works, including:

 Life and Times of John Huss (1863–64)  
 History of the Presbyterian Church in the United States (1864)  
 The Moral System (1874)

References

External links
 
 
Yale Obituary Record

1823 births
1875 deaths
People from Colchester, Connecticut
American Presbyterian ministers
American Calvinist and Reformed theologians
American biographers
American male biographers
Yale University alumni
New York University faculty
19th-century Calvinist and Reformed theologians
19th-century male writers
19th-century American clergy